Major-General Anthony John Raper CB CBE is a former Quartermaster-General to the Forces.

Military career
Educated at Welbeck Defence Sixth Form College, and the Royal Military Academy Sandhurst, Raper was commissioned into the Royal Corps of Signals in 1970. He subsequently undertook an army-funded in-service degree at Selwyn College, Cambridge, where he graduated in 1974. He was deployed to Bosnia, where he provided communications support for the Implementation Force (IFOR) in 1995.

In 1998 he was appointed chief executive of the Defence Communications Services Agency.

In 2001 he moved to the Defence Logistics Organisation, where he became director-general for strategy & logistic development: then in 2002 he was promoted to Defence Logistics Transformation Team leader as well as Quartermaster-General to the Forces. He retired in 2006.

He was also colonel commandant of the Royal Corps of Signals.

References

 

|-

British Army generals
Companions of the Order of the Bath
Commanders of the Order of the British Empire
Royal Corps of Signals officers
Alumni of Selwyn College, Cambridge
Living people
Year of birth missing (living people)
People educated at Welbeck Defence Sixth Form College